The Foley Downtown Historic District, in Foley, Alabama, is a historic district which was listed on the National Register of Historic Places in 2005.

The district was amended by a boundary decrease listing in 2012, and a boundary increase in 2019.

Buildings
It included:
The Depot, i.e. the former railroad depot of Foley, which in 2003 was the City of Foley History Museum, at 125 East Laurel Avenue, (c. 1909; 1971; 1995). This is a one-story weatherboard Craftsman style depot building with a hipped and cross gable roof, decorative wood brackets, and a brick foundation. The building was moved to Magnolia Springs in 1971 but was then moved back to its original site in Foley in 1995.
 A Masonic Temple building (c.1925), designed in Mission Revival style by George B. Rogers of Mobile, Alabama

Architects who have one or more projects in the district include Frank Lockwood and Warren, Knight & Davis.

Notes
Architecture: Colonial Revival, Tudor Revival, et al.
Historic function: Domestic; Commerce/trade; Government; Social; Religion; Industry/processing/extraction; Health Care
Historic subfunction: Single Dwelling; Hotel; Specialty Store; Warehouse; Restaurant; City Hall; Meeting Hall
Criteria: Event, Architecture/engineering
Government: Government; Commerce/trade; Health Care; Recreation And Culture; Domestic; Landscape
Subgovernment: Post Office; Specialty Store; Hospital; Auditorium; Park; Single Dwelling; Business
Criteria: event, event, architecture/engineering, architecture/engineering
Number of acres: 19.4
Number of contributing buildings: 28
Number of contributing sites: 1

References

Historic districts on the National Register of Historic Places in Alabama
National Register of Historic Places in Baldwin County, Alabama
Colonial Revival architecture in Alabama
Tudor Revival architecture in the United States